Lakshmia is a genus of moths in the family Cossidae endemic to southeast Asia.

Species
 Lakshmia hauensteini Yakovlev, 2004
 Lakshmia pandava Yakovlev & K. Nakao, 2013
 Lakshmia sirena Yakovlev, 2006
 Lakshmia zolotuhini Yakovlev, 2004

Former species
 Lakshmia dea Yakovlev, 2006

References

 , 2004: Cossidae of Thailand. Part 1. (Lepidoptera: Cossidae). Atalanta 35 (3–4): 335–351.
 , 2006, New Cossidae (Lepidoptera) from Asia, Africa and Macronesia, Tinea 19 (3): 188–213.
 , 2013: A new species of Lakshmia Yakovlev, 2004 (Lepidoptera: Cossidae) from northern Thailand with a world catalogue of the genus. Zootaxa 3736(2): 198–200.
 , 2009: The Carpenter Moths (Lepidoptera:Cossidae) of Vietnam. Entomofauna Supplement 16: 11–32.

External links

Natural History Museum Lepidoptera generic names catalog

Zeuzerinae
Cossidae genera